The Trofeo Costa del Sol (formerly "Trofeo Internacional Costa del Sol") is a football friendly competition, financed by the Spain Football Federation and held in the city of Málaga, organised by both CD Málaga and Málaga City Council.

The competition initially ran from 1961 to 1983, being then discontinued due to financial difficulties until 2004, when it was finally relaunched. Since CD Málaga no longer exists as such, Málaga CF now participates in their stead.

History
The competition was held between 1961 and 1984 with four clubs participating, the local team and three invited clubs, with the exception of 1981 and 1982 when it was interrupted due to La Rosaleda Stadium being refurbished for the 1982 FIFA World Cup. Tottenham were invited in 1965 in which they won the trophy and then back in 1966 to defend it which they then won again.

Nevertheless, CD Málaga's financial problems resulted in the competition being discontinued in 1983.

The Trofeo Costa del Sol was relaunched in 2004, and was then staged until 2018. From the 2005 edition onwards, only one team was invited to play against the host team.

Some of the most notable players to have taken part in the Trofeo Costa del Sol are Pelé (1967), Eusébio (1966), Alfredo Di Stéfano (1963) and Johan Cruyff (1977), playing for their respective clubs. National teams such as the Argentina have participated in the competition as well.

List of champions

Notes

References

Spanish football friendly trophies
CD Málaga
Málaga CF
1961 establishments in Spain
Costa del Sol Trophy